The Road, is the debut, full-length studio album by American Staind frontman Aaron Lewis. His second country music effort, it was released by Blaster Records on November 13, 2012.

Content 
The song "Granddaddy's Gun" was previously recorded by Rhett Akins on the 2010 album Michael Waddell's Bone Collector: The Brotherhood Album. It was also recorded by Blake Shelton on his 2013 album, Based on a True Story....
The iTunes deluxe edition of the album features five live bonus tracks. It includes a cover of the song "What Hurts the Most", which was previously recorded by Mark Wills and Rascal Flatts. Two more songs, "Vicious Circles" and "Country Boy", originally appeared on Lewis' 2011 EP, Town Line.

Commercial reception
The album debuted on Billboard's Top Country Albums chart at No. 7, selling 21,000 copies. The album has sold 220,000 copies in the United States as of August 2016.

Track listing

Reception 
Upon its release, The Road received generally mixed to positive reviews from most music critics. Rick Florino with Artistdirect rated the album five out of five stars. He praised Lewis' performance, saying "he's a vivid storyteller and brilliant lyricist." Daryl Addison of Great American Country was positive in saying, "on The Road, Aaron creates a work that honors country tradition while injecting his own soul and experience." Dan MacIntosh of Roughstock.com rated the album four stars, saying, "that it sounds like an honest to goodness country album, start to finish" and that "The Road is positive proof that Aaron Lewis has the musical goods and can most certainly deliver." NoizeNews rated the album a 9 out of 10 stating, "The Road is a simple album with strong lyrics and instrumentation that highlight the beauty of Aaron Lewis’ voice."

Others were more critical of Lewis' efforts.  Alex Beebe with sputnikmusic rated the album "poor" with a one out of five rating. He stated, "Aaron Lewis has created a possible cure for insomnia more than he has an enjoyable album." Gary Suarez of PopMatters gave an average rating of 4 out of 10 rating stating, "Lewis shifts effortlessly from Staind’s emotive construction rock to sincere country on his full-length solo debut The Road. Stephen Thomas Erlewine with AllMusic rated the album 2 out of 5 stars. Erlewine was critical in saying, "his music doesn't have much color; it's by-the-numbers red state country, hitting all of its marks and making no lasting impression."

Personnel 
 Eddie Bayers – drums
 Jim "Moose" Brown – piano, B-3 organ
 Perry Coleman – background vocals
 Paul Franklin – steel guitar
 Tony Harrell – piano, B-3 organ
 Mark Hill – bass guitar
 Ben Kitterman – dobro, acoustic guitar
 Aaron Lewis – lead vocals, acoustic guitar
 Sol Littlefield – electric guitar
 B. James Lowry – acoustic guitar
 Brent Mason – electric guitar
 Michael Rhodes – bass guitar

Chart performance

Album

Singles

References 

2013 debut albums
Aaron Lewis albums
Albums produced by James Stroud